Gordon Chan Kar-Seung (born January 16, 1960) is a Hong Kong filmmaker.

Filmography

Director

18 Golden Destroyers (1985)
The Yuppie Fantasia (1988)
Diary of a Small Man (1989)
Brief Encounter in Shinjuku (1990)
Fight Back to School (1991)
Inspector Pink Dragon (1991)
Royal Tramp (1992)
Royal Tramp 2 (1992)
Fight Back to School II (1992)
Gameboy Kids (1992)
King of Beggars (1992)
The Long and Winding Road (1994)
The Final Option (1994)
Fist of Legend (1994)
Thunderbolt (1995)
First Option (1996)
Armageddon (1997)
Beast Cops (1998)
2000 AD (2000)
Okinawa Rendez-vous (2000)
Cat and Mouse (2003)
The Medallion (2003)
A-1 Headline (2004)
Kung Fu Master (2005)
Undercover Hidden Dragon (2006)
Mr. 3 Minutes (2006)
Painted Skin (2008)
The King of Fighters  (2010)
Mural (2011)
The Four (2012)
The Dark Meteors (2012)
The Four II (2013)
The Four III (2014)
Secret Treasure (Unreleased)
God of War (2017)
Tempting Hearts (2021)
Faces in the Crowd (2023)

Writer

Behind the Yellow Line (1984)
The Yuppie Fantasia (1988)
Dragons Forever (1988)
Double Fattiness (1988)
Heart to Hearts (1988)
The Big Heat (1988)
Diary of a Small Man (1989)
Brief Encounter in Shinjuku (1990)
Fight Back to School (1991)
The Cat (1991)
Hard Boiled (1992)
Game Boy Kids (1992)
She Starts the Fire (1992)
King of Beggars (1992)
The Long and Winding Road (1994)
The Final Option (1994)
The Bodyguard from Beijing (1994)
Fist of Legend (1994)
Thunderbolt (1995)
First Option (1996)
Armageddon (1997)
Beast Cops (1998)
Cat and Mouse (2003)
The Medallion (2003)
A-1 Headline (2004)
Daisy (2006)
Undercover Hidden Dragon (2006)
Mr. 3 Minutes (2006)
Painted Skin (2008)
Legend of the Fist: The Return of Chen Zhen (2010)
Mural (2011)

Producer

The Vineyard (1989)
Neverending Summer (1992)
1001 Nights (1995)
Armageddon (1997)
Cause We Are So Young (1997)
Option Zero (1997)
Hitman (1998)
When I Look Upon the Stars (1999)
Okinawa Rendez-vous (2000)
Heroes in Love (2001)
Funeral March (2001)
Every Dog Has His Date (2001)
Time 4 Hope (2002)
A-1 Headline (2004)
Kung Fu Master (2005)
Curse of Lola (2005)
Mr. 3 Minutes (2006)
Painted Skin (2008)
Legend of the Fist: The Return of Chen Zhen (2010)
Mural (2011)
Coming Back (2011)

References

External links
 
 Gordon Chan interviewed on Hong Kong Cinemagic

1960 births
Living people
Hong Kong film directors
Hong Kong film producers
Hong Kong screenwriters